The National Secular Lobby is an Australian pro-secular organisation, founded in July 2017 and officially launched in January 2018. It aims to promote secular principles and the separation of church and state in Australia.

The National Secular Lobby combines the building of grassroots awareness and action with the direct lobbying of parliamentarians by high profile ambassadors. It has made submissions to various parliamentary inquiries, including the Religious Freedom Review (2018), the 2021 Census Topic Review (2018), and the Parliamentary Prayers Inquiry (2018).

Ambassadors

Current National Secular Lobby ambassadors are:

 Phillip Adams
 Van Badham
 Dr Luke Beck
 Julian Burnside
 Jane Caro
 Fiona Patten
 Chris Schacht
 Dr Paul Willis
 Dr David Zyngier

See also
 Secular Party of Australia
 Secular state
 Secularism
 Secularity

References

External links
 The National Secular Lobby website

Church–state separation advocacy organizations
Secularism in Australia